This article summarizes healthcare in Utah.

Utah Department of Health

The Utah Department of Health manages state government projects in Utah.

The health insurance marketplace for Utah is Avenue H.

Hospitals in Utah

Utah has hospitals serving every part of the state.

Health campaigns in Utah
HealthInsight, a regional nonprofit organization, organizes the Choosing Wisely campaign in Utah.

References

External links
Utah Department of Health